The 2018 South Korean by-elections was held in South Korea on 13 June 2018, coinciding with the local elections. 12 seats to the National Assembly of South Korea were contested.

Reasons for by-elections 
The following Members of National Assembly lost or resigned from their seats:
 Seoul Nowon C District: Ahn Cheol-soo (People's), due to Ahn's candidacy for the President of South Korea.
 Seoul Songpa B District: Choi Myung-gil (People's), due to Choi's violation of the Public Official Election Act.
 Busan Haeundae B District: Bae Duk-kwang (Liberty Korea), due to Bae's resignation from the National Assembly.
 Incheon Namdong A District: Park Nam-choon (Democratic), due to Park's resignation from the National Assembly, to run 2018 Incheon mayoral election.
 Gwangju Seo A District: Song Gi-seok (People's), due to Song's violation of the Public Official Election Act and embezzlement.
 Ulsan Buk District: Yoon Jong-oh (Minjung), due to Yoon's violation of the Public Official Election Act.
 North Chungcheong Jecheon-Danyang District: Kwon Suk-chang (Liberty Korea),due to Kwok's violation of the Public Official Election Act.
 South Chungcheong Cheonan A District: Park Chan-woo (Liberty Korea), due to Park's violation of the Public Official Election Act.
 South Chungcheong Cheonan C District: Yang Seung-cho (Democratic), due to Yang's resignation from the National Assembly, to run 2018 South Chungcheong Province gubernatorial election.
 South Jeolla Yeongam–Muan–Sinan District: Park Jun-yeong (Democracy and Peace), due to Park's violation of the Public Official Election Act.
 North Gyeongsang Gimcheon District: Lee Cheol-woo (Liberty Korea), due to Lee's resignation from the National Assembly, to run 2018 North Gyeongsang Province gubernatorial election.
 South Gyeongsang Gimhae B District: Kim Kyung-soo (Democratic), due to Kim's resignation from the National Assembly, to run 2018 South Gyeongsang Province gubernatorial election.

Results

Seat control

Summary

References 

2018
2018 elections in South Korea
June 2018 events in South Korea